John Lott (born 1958) is an American economist, political commentator, and gun rights advocate.

John Lott may also refer to:

 John A. Lott (1806–1878), American lawyer and politician
 John Lott (American football, born 1905) (1905–1992), American football tackle
 John Lott (American football, born 1964), American football offensive tackle and coach
 John Lott (mathematician) (born 1959) known for his contributions to differential geometry